Easton Area School District is an urban, suburban, and rural public school district located in Northampton County in the Lehigh Valley region of eastern Pennsylvania. It serves the city of Easton, as well as Forks, Palmer, and portions of Lower Mount Bethel Townships.  

Students in grades nine through 12 attend Easton Area High School in Easton. Students in grades five through eight attend Easton Area Middle School, and the district has six elementary schools, Ada B. Cheston, F.A. March, Forks, Palmer, Paxinosa, and Shawnee, for kindergarten through fourth grades. As of the 2020–21 school year, the school district had a total enrollment of 8,289 students between all nine of its schools, according to National Center for Education Statistics data. 

Easton Area School District encompasses approximately 28 square miles. In 2009, the per capita income was $20,875, while the median family income was $53,545. According to 2005 local census data, it served a resident population of 63,195. As of the 2021-22 school year, Easton Area School District served 7.984 students between its nine schools, according to the National Center for Education Statistics.

Schools
 Easton Area High School
 Easton Area Middle School
 Ada B. Cheston Elementary School
 F.A. March Elementary School
 Forks Elementary School
 Palmer Elementary School
 Paxinosa Elementary School
 Shawnee Elementary School
 Tracy Elementary School

Grade Configuration within the EASD:
K–5 (Elementary School)
6–8 (Middle School)
9–12 (High School)

References

External links
Official website

School districts in Northampton County, Pennsylvania